Fort Gibraltar was founded in 1809 by Alexander Macdonell of Greenfield of the North West Company in present-day Manitoba, Canada. It was located at the confluence of the Red and Assiniboine rivers in or near the area now known as The Forks in the city of Winnipeg. Fort Gibraltar was renamed Fort Garry after the merger of North West Company and the Hudson's Bay Company in 1821, and became Upper Fort Garry in 1835.

History 

In the early 19th century fur-trading was the main industry of Western Canada. Two companies had an intense competition over the trade.  The first, the Hudson's Bay Company, was a London, England-based organization. The second, the North West Company, was based in Montreal. Hudson's Bay Company was distinctly English in its culture and flavour while the North West Company was a mix of French, Scottish and First Nations cultures.

The voyageurs of the North West Company were a highly mobile group of fur traders.  They established temporary encampments in the forks region that later became Winnipeg.

In 1809 the North West Company built Fort Gibraltar. About half a mile north the Selkirk settlers and HBC employees built Fort Douglas which was started in 1813 and completed in 1815. There were many conflicts between the mostly Scottish employees of the HBC and the NWC employees, who were mostly French-Canadians and Métis.(see Pemmican War)

On March 17, 1816, Fort Gibraltar was captured and destroyed by Robert Semple, new Governor of the Red River Colony. The action was ruled illegal by British authorities and the North West Company was given permission to rebuild the fort in 1817.

On March 26, 1821,  the North West Company was merged with its rival under the name of the Hudson's Bay Company.

The site of the fort was designated a National Historic Site in 1924 as part of the "Forts Rouge, Garry, and Gibraltar National Historic Site of Canada".

Chronology of Fort Gibraltar
 1809: The North West Company builds Fort Gibraltar
 1816: Fort Gibraltar is captured and destroyed by the Red River Colony
 1817: Fort Gibraltar is rebuilt by the North West Company
 1821: The North West Company merges with Hudson's Bay Company – Fort Gibraltar continues its operations under the Hudson's Bay Company standard
 1822: Fort Gibraltar is renamed Fort Garry 
 1835: Fort Garry is rebuilt after being destroyed by the 1826 flood and the name changed to Upper Fort Garry

Fort Gibraltar Museum
A reconstructed Fort Gibraltar located in Whittier Park in St. Boniface, Winnipeg was built in the late 1970s for the Festival du Voyageur, the largest winter festival in Western Canada.  In the summer, the museum operates living history demonstrations of life in the fur trading post as in 1815.
Fort Gibraltar is currently located in Whittier Park at 866 St Joseph Street.

References

External links 

 Fort Gibraltar official website
 Plan of the Settlement on Red River as it was June 1816
 The Lord Selkirk Settlement at Red River, Part 2
 List of Manitoba Forts

Gibraltar
North West Company
North West Company forts
Hudson's Bay Company forts
Museums in Winnipeg
Living museums in Canada
Gibraltar
Saint Boniface, Winnipeg